Ready is a 2008 Indian Telugu-language action comedy film directed by Srinu Vaitla. Produced by Sravanthi Ravi Kishore under the Sri Sravanthi Movies banner, the film stars Ram and Genelia while Nassar, Brahmanandam, Sunil, Chandra Mohan, Tanikella Bharani, Kota Srinivasa Rao and Jaya Prakash Reddy play other prominent roles. The music of the film is composed by Devi Sri Prasad. It turned out to be a Blockbuster at the box-office and was one of the highest grossing Telugu movies of 2008.

The film received three Nandi Awards, including the Best Popular Feature Film. It was later remade in Kannada as Raam (2009), Tamil as Uthama Puthiran (2010) and in Hindi under the same name in 2011.

Plot
Raghupathi is the eldest of his three brothers — the other two being Raghava and Rajaram. They also have a sister Swarajyam. Chandu is the only son of Raghava. The family owns the shopping mall R S Brothers. Chandu plans the elopement of his cousin Swapna with her boyfriend due to which he is ousted from the house and is isolated from his family by Raghupathi. However, Chandu tries to re-establish links with his family members, but to no avail. Meanwhile, on the last day of his college, Chandu and his friends meet their friend "Google" Gopi who is depressed because his girlfriend will marry someone else. Chandu decides to stop the marriage and marry off her to Gopi. However, they kidnap Pooja instead of Gopi's girlfriend due to a mistaken identity due to the function hall's name. After being chased by some hooligans – who are after Pooja – they escape with the exception of Chandu and Pooja who end up in the forest. Chandu falls for Pooja who also reciprocates her feelings.

After learning that her best friend is not in town, Pooja decides to stay in Chandu's home disguising herself as a disciple of Raghupathi's spiritual guru. Chandu is also welcomed back in his family. When he was about to propose to Pooja, Chandu gets to know about the true identity of Pooja. She is an NRI who came to visit her warring maternal uncles Peddinaidu and Chittinaidu. Both of them try to force her into marriage with their respective sons to get a hold of her property she inherits. Chandu decides to transform them before marrying Pooja. He joins their auditor "McDowell" Murthy as his assistant. Murthy introduces Chandu as his nephew to both Peddinaidu and Chittinaidu. When asked about Chandu's experience in auditing, Murthy lies to them that he used to be an auditor in America to imaginary brothers "Chicago" Subba Rao and "Dallas" Nageswara Rao.

Chandu manipulates Murthy's funny idea and makes his uncle Raghupathi and his father pose as Chicago Subba Rao and Dallas Nageswara Rao respectively. Swarajyam's husband and Rajaram pose themselves as the friends of Pooja's parents and make Peddinaidu think twice about his son's marriage with Pooja after they deliberately lie to him that her parents took a loan of 1 billion from World Bank. Chittinaidu also decides to call off his son's marriage with Pooja after Chandu plays a prank on him that Chicago Subba Rao's daughter has more property than Pooja. After some hilarious twists and turns, Chandu and his uncle Raghupathi bring about a positive change in both Chittinaidu and Peddinaidu and Pooja marries Chandu after her uncles give their consent.

Cast

 Ram as Chandu/Danayya, a happy-go-lucky guy who is always willing to help others. He is introduced to Pooja as Danayya
 Genelia as Pooja Naidu, an NRI who comes to India to visit her maternal uncles. She lost her parents in an air accident and is brought up by her uncles.
 Brahmanandam as "McDowell" Murthy, Peddi Naidu and Chitti Naidu's Auditor & Charted Accountant.
 Nassar as Raghupathi, the head of his family and business. He loves acting and is shown to have received the Best Actor award from N. T. Rama Rao for a play in theater. He disguises himself as Chicago Subba Rao, an Indian American industrialist.
 Sunil as Janaki, Chandu's cousin
 Chandra Mohan as Swarajyam's husband and Janaki's father.  He disguises himself as a World Bank executive.
 Tanikella Bharani as Raghava, Raghupathi's younger brother and Chandu's father. He disguises himself as Dallas Nageswara Rao.
 Kota Srinivasa Rao as Peddi Naidu, the elder of the two brothers. He tries to marry off his son to Pooja to grab her property, in the process even breaking up with his brother
 Jaya Prakash Reddy as Chitti Naidu, the younger of the two brothers. He also tries to force Pooja into marrying his son, eyeing her property. He even spars with his brother on whose son should marry Pooja.
 Supreeth Reddy as Narasimha, Peddi Naidu's right-hand man 
 Shafi as Nagappa, Chitti Naidu's son 
 Pragathi as Rajyam, Chandu's mother
 Sudha as Lakshmi, Raghupathi's wife
 Rajitha as Swarajya Lakshmi, Janaki's mother
 Srinivasa Reddy as Raju Garu, Chandu's friend
 M. S. Narayana as Chinna Sastry
 Venkata Giridhar as Rajaram
 Satya Krishnan as Rajaram's wife
 Dharmavarapu Subramanyam as Santosh "Happy" Reddy
 Balayya as Peddha Sastry
 Ravi Varma as Google Gopi, Chandu's friend
 Master Bharath as Chinna Chitti Naidu
 Surekha Vani as Chinna Chitti Naidu's mother
 Master Uday Nair as Chinna Peddi Naidu
 Ravishankar Dwivedula as Purohith who performs marriage for Google Gopi
 Saranya
 Vinaya Prasad
 Jenny
 Prudhvi Raj
 Amit Tiwari
 Fish Venkat
 Suman Setty
 Tamannaah Bhatia as Swapna, Chandu's cousin (Guest appearance)
 Navdeep as Swapna's Boyfriend (Guest appearance)

Soundtrack

The film has six songs composed by Devi Sri Prasad. The audio was released on 19 May 2008 and the reviews were mostly positive.

Reception
Jeevi of Idlebrain.com rated the film at 3.25 out of a scale of 5 saying that it is "Stuffed with ample commercial elements, mainly vibrant comedy". Teluguone.com rated the film at 3.75 out of 5 saying that the film is a "Neat family entertainer with an appreciable dose of clean comedy". It also says that though "The story and treatment has shades of Gudumba Shankar to a large extent, but good-natured comedy makes the movie quite enjoyable for a light viewing". Ram was fabulous and Brahmanandam was well appreciated for his performance by Sify.com saying that "As 'McDowell' Murthy, Brahmanandam brings the house down".

Awards
Nandi Awards - 2008 - Won
 Best Popular Feature Film - Sravanthi Ravi Kishore 
 Best Male Comedian – Bramhanandam
 Best Child Actor – Master Bharath

Filmfare Awards South
Nominations
 Best Film – Ravi Kishore
 Best Director – Srinu Vaitla
 Best Actor – Ram
 Best Supporting Actor – Brahmanandam

Remakes
 Kannada: Raam – Director: Madesha
 Tamil: Uthama Puthiran – Director: Mithran Jawahar
 Hindi: Ready – Director: Anees Bazmee

References

External links
 

2008 films
2008 action comedy films
Telugu films remade in other languages
Indian romantic comedy films
Films directed by Srinu Vaitla
2000s Telugu-language films
Films scored by Devi Sri Prasad
Films shot in Hyderabad, India
Indian action comedy films
2008 romantic comedy films